Česma is a river in central Croatia, a left tributary of the river Lonja-Trebež. 

Created by merging streams Grđevica and Barna at  near the village of Pavlovac in the municipality of Veliki Grđevac.
Česma basin is fan-shaped and formed by a number of streams rising on the slopes of Bilogora and Moslavačka gora hills. Southern sides of Bilogora slightly goes downhill, rugged with numerous ravines and gullies, steeply and deeply cut in. On the sides appears numerous springs, that in the dry part of the year losing water.

It has a small drop (small difference in altitude between the source and the mouth) which was causing frequent floods before the regulation of the riverbed.
The area around the watercourse of Česma till a hundred years ago was subject of flooding, which is why it was swampy. After that, Česma river and its tributaries was channelized, embankments were built for flood protection, and the soil is dried to obtain arable land as well as the fight against malaria.

At the site of former wetlands now are fish ponds that supply water from streams that flows into the Česma river. These ponds are one of the last refuge of wading birds between the Drava and Sava rivers.

Along Česma river there are several major fish farming complexes. North of Česma fish pond — ribnjačastvo Dubrava, and along the southern coast fish ponds — Siščani, Blatnica and Narta. Both complexes are spread at about 5 kilometers along the course Česma river, and environment are similar. They are about 5 kilometers away to each other.

References 

Rivers of Croatia